Chandra Kumara, also known as Gamini Chandrakumara, (born 6 May 1983) is a Sri Lankan cricketer. He played 49 first-class and 44 List A matches between 2001 and 2011. He was also part of Sri Lanka's squad for the 2002 Under-19 Cricket World Cup.

References

External links
 

1983 births
Living people
Sri Lankan cricketers
Colombo Cricket Club cricketers
Galle Cricket Club cricketers
Cricketers from Colombo